Tributylamine (TBA) is an organic compound with the molecular formula (C4H9)3N. It is a colorless liquid with an amine-like odor.

Uses
Tributylamine is used as a catalyst (proton acceptor) and as a solvent in organic syntheses and polymerization (including polyurethanes).

References

Amine solvents
Alkylamines
Tertiary amines
Butyl compounds